Anyone but Them is a 2018 Russian comedy film directed by Aleksandr Boykov. It stars Polina Maksimova and Yulia Khlynina.

Plot 
A group of deadbeat teenagers, among whom are Mathematician, Blonde, Rocker, Major, Loser and Psycho, wake up after a wild party and discover that the world has suddenly become different. They understand that they overslept the beginning of the apocalypse and find themselves in a dilapidated and deserted city, where danger lurks at every turn. But now the fate of all mankind is in their hands, and the guys have no choice but to join forces in the face of imminent danger.

Each of the characters has their own specific set of skills and talents, but each of them also have their own weaknesses. Soon after awakening, the gang discovers that they are not alone in the city. A bloodthirsty and invulnerable monster starts to hunt them, as well as a whole army of unknown thugs. They try to run away, but after a while they have to stop and engage in a fierce fight in order to prove themselves as heroes.

Cast
Polina Maksimova as Blonde
Yulia Khlynina as Bitch
Denis Buzin as Psycho
Sergey Yakimovich as Botan
Sergey Dubrov as  Rocker
Daniil Steklov as Major
Yevgenia Turkova as Loser
Daria Khramtsova as brutal girl
Vladimir Steklov as Mayor, father of Major
Igor Yasulovich as Botan’s grandfather, scientist
Sergey Belogolovtsev as father of Loser
Alexander Semchev as precinct
Sergey Rost as gangster
Maxim Konovalov as bandit leader
Nikita Tarasov as psychologist
Alexey Dmitriev as gangster
Alexey Dadaev as Monster Understudy
Andrey Amshinsky as alcoholic
Yegor Sheremetyev as security guard
 Sergey Burunov as Professor Xavierov (only in the trailer, scene with him not include in film)

Production
The shooting took place in the summer of 2014 in the Samara Region (Samara, Togliatti) and partially in Moscow.

References

External links 
 

2018 films
2010s Russian-language films
2010s science fiction comedy films
Russian science fiction comedy films
Apocalyptic films
2018 comedy films